Lekki is a city in Lagos State, Nigeria.

Lekki may also refer to:

 Lekki Lagoon, in Lagos and Ogun states, Nigeria
 Port at Lekki, the seaport of Lekki, Lagos State, Nigeria
 Ibeju-Lekki, a local government area in Eti-Osa, Lagos State, Nigeria

See also